Aragon House is a Grade II listed public house at 249 New King's Road, Parsons Green, London.

It was built in 1805–06, but the architect is not known.

Aragon House gets its name from having been the site of a dower house belonging to Queen Catherine of Aragon, the first of Henry VIII's six wives.

Aragon House and Gosford Lodge were built on the site of a villa that the author Samuel Richardson lived in from 1756 until his death in 1761.

References

Grade II listed buildings in the London Borough of Hammersmith and Fulham
Grade II listed pubs in London
Fulham
1806 establishments in England
Pubs in the London Borough of Hammersmith and Fulham